Tsurayuki is a crater on Mercury. Its name was adopted by the International Astronomical Union (IAU) in 1976. Tsurayuki is named for Japanese author, poet, and courtier Ki no Tsurayuki.

Tsurayuki lies on the north rim of Pushkin crater.

References

Impact craters on Mercury